Rita La Roy (born Ina La Roi Stuart; October 2, 1901 – February 18, 1993) was an American actress and dancer, beginning her career in 1929, and having her last significant role in 1940.

Career
La Roy appeared in over 50 films, the best known of which was Blonde Venus, which starred Marlene Dietrich. After her acting career, she had a school for models in Hollywood.

Early life
While the studio publicity machine claimed she had been born in Paris, France, she was actually born in the small town of Bonners Ferry, Idaho in 1901. Her early years saw her work as both a dress designer and a stock company actress, before moving onto vaudeville, where she became a dancer. 

Performing on the Pantages and Orpheum theater circuits, she was known for erotic acts, which included dances such as the "frog dance", the "peacock dance" and the "cobra dance" in which her feet and legs were tied together under a stylized snakeskin so that she danced by undulating her torso."

Film career
In 1929, she made her film debut in The Delightful Rogue, starring opposite matinee idol Rod La Rocque.  

Over the next several years, working as part of the RKO Radio Pictures stable, she appeared in both starring and supporting roles. While her final significant role was in the 1940 comedy-mystery Hold That Woman!, she had several small roles during the 1940s, including in such films as Sergeant York and You're My Everything.

Post-film life
After retiring from film, for the most part, in the early 1940s, she ran the Rita La Roy Modeling School and Agency. She later wrote and produced her own shows for the local television station in Los Angeles, KTLA. For one of those programs she won an Emmy in 1948. She died of pneumonia in Chula Vista, California in 1993, aged 91.

Filmography

References

External links 

Rotten Tomatoes profile

1901 births
1993 deaths
American film actresses
Vaudeville performers
Emmy Award winners
People from Bonners Ferry, Idaho
Actresses from Idaho
20th-century American actresses
RKO Pictures contract players
Deaths from pneumonia in California